This is a complete list of all Aerial bombs  used by the Imperial Japanese Army during the Second World War.

Bombs
 Type 92 15 kg High-explosive bomb
 Type 99 30 kg High-explosive bomb
 Type 94 50 kg High-explosive bomb
 Type 94 100 kg High-explosive bomb
 Type 3 100 kg High-explosive bomb
 Type 94 Mod. 50 kg High-explosive bomb
 Type 94 Mod. 100 kg High-explosive bomb
 Type 1 50 kg High-explosive bomb
 Type 1 100 kg High-explosive bomb
 Type 1 250 kg High-explosive bomb
 Type 92 250 kg High-explosive bomb
 Type 92 500 kg High-explosive bomb
 Type 4456 100 kg Skipping bomb
 Type 3 250 kg Skipping bomb
 Type 4 100 kg Anti-shipping bomb
 Type 4 250 kg Anti-shipping bomb
 Type 4 500 kg Anti-shipping bomb

Fire bombs
 1 kg thermite incendiary bomb
 5 kg thermite incendiary bomb
 Type 97 50 kg Incendiary bomb
 Type 100 50 kg Incendiary bomb

Smoke bombs
 Type 100 50 kg smoke bomb

Gas bomb
 Type 92 50 kg gas bomb

Flares
 Type 90 parachute flare
 Type 1 12 kg parachute flare
 Type 3 parachute flare
 Type 97 concrete bomb
 Type 94 substitute bomb
 Type 1 30 kg substitute bomb

Practice bomb
 Type 95 4 kg practice bomb

Cluster bomb
 Type 2⅓ kg cluster bomb
 Type 3½ kg cluster bomb
 Type 2½ kg cluster bomb
 Container for Type 2⅓ kg cluster bombs
 Container for 76 Type 2⅓ kg cluster bombs
 Container for 63 Type 3½ kg cluster bombs
 Type 1 1 kg aircraft missile
 50 kg pamphlet container
 100 kg pamphlet container

See also
 List of Japanese World War II navy bombs

References
 

Army Bombs
Japan, World War II
World War II, bombs
Army bombs